Patricia Mayr-Achleitner was the champion from 2010, and successfully defended her title by defeating Ksenia Pervak in the final, 6–1, 6–0.

Seeds

Main draw

Finals

Top half

Bottom half

References 
 Main draw

Smart Card Open Monet Plus - Singles